Motkupalli Narasimhulu is an Indian politician.  He represented Thungathurthi constituency (SC reserved) in Nalgonda district, Telangana.

Life
He was born in Nalgonda district.

He was elected as MLA from Thungathurthi (SC) (Assembly constituency) in  2009 as part of Chandrababu Naidu's government and has been elected to AP assembly 6 times.

He came out of Telugu Desam Party in 2018 and is strongly working against TDP.

References

People from Telangana
Telangana politicians
Telugu politicians
People from Nalgonda
Telugu Desam Party politicians
Living people
Year of birth missing (living people)